is a Japanese actress, voice actress, and singer from Akita Prefecture who is affiliated with Honeycomb Entertainment. Her entertainment career began in 2008 when she was selected to play Annie in a musical production of Annie in 2008. She started a music career in 2014 under the stage name Rico, before reverting to using her real name in 2016. That same year, she started a voice acting career. As a voice actress, she is known for her roles as Poporon in Dropkick on My Devil!, Daia in Kiratto Pri Chan, and Ayako Yamada in Kageki Shojo!!, while her music has been featured in anime series such as Danchi Tomoo, Duel Masters, and Bofuri.

Biography

Sasaki was born in Akita Prefecture on November 10, 1997. She had an interest in music from an early age, partly under the influence of her grandmother, and she began taking voice lessons while in elementary school. While in her third year of elementary, she watched a Japanese production of the musical Annie, which inspired her to pursue a career in theater. Partly at the suggestion of her teacher, she auditioned for a role in Annie, and out of around 9,000 applicants, she was selected to play the titular role Annie; she began appearing in productions in late 2008.

In 2013, Sasaki launched a music career after winning a competition held by Teichiku Records as part of its 80th anniversary, beating 3,836 other applicants; she debuted under the stage name Rico. Her first single, "Come and Get It!", was released on July 23, 2014. That same year, she joined Honeycomb Entertainment.

Sasaki studied music at the Tokiwagi Gakuen High School in Sendai and graduated from the school in 2016. That same year, she started using her real name for entertainment activities and released the single . She also started a voice acting career, a decision she originally made while still in junior high school at the urging of a friend and one of her agency's staff members. Among her early roles was as the character Nanami in the anime television series Clione no Akari.

In 2018, she formed the music duo Re-connect together with singer Kyoco; the duo was forced to suspend activities in 2019 after Kyoco's contract with her agency was terminated. Her song , released on February 21 of that year, was used as an ending theme to the anime series Duel Masters. She was also cast as the character Poporon in the anime television series Dropkick on My Devil!. In 2019, she played the role of Daia in Kiratto Pri Chan.

In 2020 Sasaki released the single "Play the world"; the title song was used as the ending theme to the anime series Bofuri. In 2021, she played the role of Ayako Yamada in the anime series Kageki Shojo!.

Filmography

Anime
2016
Crane Game Girls as Kyōko
Cardfight!! Vanguard G as Boy 3
Omoi no Kakera as Michiru
All Out!! as Female student

2017
Love Kome as Gurue
Clione no Akari as Nanami Yukine

2018
Dropkick on My Devil! as Poporon

2019
Kiratto Pri Chan as Daia Nijinosaki

2020
Love Live! Nijigasaki High School Idol Club as Student council secretary

2021
Kageki Shojo!! as Ayako Yamada

2023
World Dai Star as Chisa Sasuga

Video games
2020
Death End Request 2 as Makoto Franper

2022
Azure Striker Gunvolt 3 as Layla, Luxia

Discography

Singles
As Rico Sasaki:
 (Release date: July 22, 2016)
"Recollections" (Release date: June 21, 2017)
 (Release date: February 21, 2018)
 (Release date: January 9, 2019)
 (Release date: January 9, 2019)
 (Release date: January 9, 2019)
 (Release date: November 20, 2019)
"Play the world" (Release date: February 26, 2020)
 (Release date: November 10, 2020)

References

External links 
 Official website 
 

1997 births
Anime musicians
Japanese musical theatre actresses
Japanese voice actresses
Voice actresses from Akita Prefecture
Teichiku Records artists
Victor Entertainment artists
Living people